The Taurus is a British 14-cylinder two-row radial aircraft engine, produced by the Bristol Engine Company starting in 1936. The Taurus was developed by adding cylinders to the existing single-row Aquila design and transforming it into a twin-row radial engine, creating a powerplant that produced just over 1,000 horsepower (750 kW) with very low weight.

Design and development
Bristol had originally intended to use the Aquila and Perseus as two of its major product lines in the 1930s, but the rapid increase in size and speed of aircraft in the 1930s demanded much larger engines than either of these. The mechanicals from both of these designs were then put into two-row configurations to develop much larger engines, the Aquila becoming the Taurus, and the Perseus becoming the Hercules.

The Taurus was a sleeve valve design, resulting in an extraordinarily uncluttered exterior and very low mechanical noise. It offered high power with a relatively low weight, starting from 1,015 hp (760 kW) in the earliest versions. It was also compact, with a diameter of 46 inches (1170 mm)  which made it attractive to fighter designers. Unfortunately, the engine has also been described as "notoriously troublesome", with protracted development and a slow growth in rated power. After several years of development, power had been increased from 1,015 hp (760 kW) to only 1,130 hp (840 kW). As the most important applications of this engine were in aircraft that flew at low altitude, engine development efforts focussed on low-altitude performance.

The first Taurus engines were delivered just before World War II began and found some use primarily in the Fairey Albacore and Bristol's own Beaufort torpedo bomber. Starting from April 1940, it was suggested to replace the Taurus engines of the latter by the famous Pratt & Whitney R-1830 Twin Wasp, itself possessing a slightly larger 48 inch (1.22 meter) diameter, but this change was postponed to the autumn of 1941 while attempts were made to cure the reliability problems of the Taurus, and later had to be temporarily reversed because of shortages of Twin Wasp engines. The Twin Wasp was, however, strongly preferred, especially for overseas postings, because of its much greater reliability. In later models of the Taurus engine the reliability problems were mostly cured by a change in the cylinder manufacturing process, although the engine kept a poor reputation, and in the Albacore the Taurus engine was retained until the end of that aircraft's production in 1943.

There were no other operational applications of the Taurus engine, because its initial reliability problems discouraged the development of Taurus-powered aircraft, and because later-war combat aircraft demanded more powerful engines. Its production lines were closed down in favour of the Hercules engine.

Variants
Taurus II
1940 1110 hp at 3100 rpm with 4.25 lb boost @ 4000 ft. 
Taurus III
1060 hp. 
Taurus VI
1130 hp. 
Taurus XII
1940 1130 hp at 3100 rpm with 4.75 lb boost @ 3500 ft. Supercharger ratio decreased, impeller diameter increased.
Taurus XVI
1940 1130 hp. 
Taurus XX
Trials engine only, one built.

Applications
Note:

Bristol Type 148
Bristol Beaufort
Fairey Albacore
Fairey Battle testbed only
Gloster F.9/37

Specifications (Taurus II)

See also

References

Notes

Bibliography
Gunston, Bill. World Encyclopedia of Aero Engines: From the Pioneers to the Present Day. 5th edition, Stroud, UK: Sutton, 2006.
Lumsden, Alec. British Piston Engines and Their Aircraft. Marlborough, UK: Airlife Publishing, 2003. .
White, Graham. Allied Aircraft Piston Engines of World War II: History and Development of Frontline Aircraft Piston Engines Produced by Great Britain and the United States During World War II. Warrendale, Pennsylvania: SAE International, 1995. 

Aircraft air-cooled radial piston engines
Taurus
Sleeve valve engines
1930s aircraft piston engines